Truman is a 2015 comedy-drama film directed by Cesc Gay and co-written by Gay and Tomàs Aragay. The film stars Ricardo Darín, Javier Cámara, and Dolores Fonzi.

It won five Goya Awards, including Best Film, Best Director, Best Original Screenplay, Best Actor (Darín), and Best Supporting Actor (Cámara).

Plot
Julián, living in Madrid, receives an unexpected visit from his friend, Tomás, a professor living in Canada. Julián is an actor and has had cancer for a year, and his only companion now is Truman, his loyal dog. The friends and Truman share four days together.

Julián reveals he is opting for assisted suicide rather than chemotherapy if his health deteriorates. His cousin Paula and Tomás are disturbed by the news and share emotional and meaningful moments during Tomás's visit. They try to cope with Julián's situation. Julián gives his dog to his friend and they bid goodbye after an intense conversation.

Cast

Production 
The film was produced by Imposible Films (Marta Esteban), BD Cine (Diego Dubcovsky) and Trumanfilm AIE alongside K&S Films and Telefé, with the participation of TVE, TVC and Movistar+.

Release 
It was screened in the Contemporary World Cinema section of the 2015 Toronto International Film Festival and in the Official Section of the 2015 San Sebastián International Film Festival, where it was awarded the Silver Shell for Best Actor for Darín and Cámara.

Distributed by Filmax, the film was theatrically released in Spain on 30 October 2015.

Accolades

|-
| align = "center" rowspan = "3" | 2015 || rowspan=3 | 63rd San Sebastián International Film Festival
| colspan=2 | Golden Shell for Best Film 
| 
|-
| Silver Shell for Best Actor
| Javier Cámara, Ricardo Darín
|   || rowspan = "2" | 
|-
| colspan=2 | II Premio Feroz Zinemaldia
| 
|-
| rowspan = "27" align = "center" | 2016 || rowspan = "3" | 21st Forqué Awards || colspan = "2" | Best Film ||  || rowspan = "3" | 
|-
| rowspan = "2" | Best Actor || Ricardo Darín || 
|-
| Javier Cámara || 
|-
| rowspan=6 | 3rd Feroz Awards
| colspan=2 | Best Drama Film
| 
| rowspan = "6" | 
|-
| Best Director
| Cesc Gay
| 
|-
| Best Screenplay
| Cesc Gay, Tomàs Aragay 
| 
|-
| rowspan=2 |Best Main Actor
| Javier Cámara
| 
|-
| Ricardo Darín
| 
|-
| Best Supporting Actress
| Dolores Fonzi
| 
|-
| rowspan = 11 | 8th Gaudí Awards || colspan = "2" | Best Non-Catalan Language Film ||  || rowspan = "11" | 
|-
| Best Director || Cesc Gay ||  
|-
| Best Screenplay || Cesc Gay, Tomàs Aragay || 
|-
| Best Actor || Ricardo Darín || 
|-
| Best Supporting Actor || Javier Cámara || 
|-
| Best Supporting Actress || Dolores Fonzi || 
|-
| Best Original Score || Nico Cota || 
|-
| Best Cinematography || Andreu Rebés || 
|-
| Best Production Supervision || Isidro Terraza || 
|-
| Best Art Direction || Irene Montcada || 
|-
| Best Sound || Albert Gay, Jesica Suárez || 
|-
| rowspan=6 | 30th Goya Awards
| colspan=2 | Best Film
| 
| rowspan = "6" | 
|-
| Best Director
| Cesc Gay
| 
|-
| Best Original Screenplay
| Cesc Gay, Tomàs Aragay
| 
|-
| Best Actor
| Ricardo Darín
| 
|-
| Best Supporting Actor
| Javier Cámara
| 
|-
| Best Editing
| Pablo Barbieri
| 
|-
| 21st Vilnius International Film Festival
| colspan = "2" | The Audience Award
| 
| 
|-
| align = "center" | 2017 || Belgian Film Critics Association
|colspan=2 | Grand Prix
| 
| 
|}

See also
 List of Spanish films of 2015

References

External links
 
 

2015 films
2015 comedy-drama films
2010s Spanish-language films
English-language Spanish films
Argentine comedy-drama films
Spanish comedy-drama films
Filmax films
Films about cancer
Films directed by Cesc Gay
Best Film Goya Award winners
Films set in Madrid
2010s English-language films
2010s Spanish films
2010s Argentine films